The Milwaukee Curling Club, now based in Cedarburg, Wisconsin, is the longest continually operating curling club in the United States. It was founded in Milwaukee in 1845 by Scots emigrants, including Alexander Mitchell (later elected "patron" of the Grand National Curling Club). In 1947, a member indicated to Bernie Roth that a women's curling club was needed because women could only play if their husbands were members; in 1949 she established the Milwaukee Kilties.

References

External links
 Official website

See also
 Royal Montreal Curling Club, oldest curling club in North America, oldest extant sports club in North America

Curling clubs in the United States
History of Milwaukee
Curling clubs established in 1845
Ozaukee County, Wisconsin
Sports in Milwaukee
1845 establishments in Wisconsin Territory
Curling in Wisconsin